The Brainerd Subdivision is a rail line owned and operated by BNSF Railway.

The line was initially built by Northern Pacific Railway with service commencing in about 1911. In 1970, the Northern Pacific merged with other railroads to form the Burlington Northern Railroad. The company then merged with Atchison, Topeka and Santa Fe Railway (ATSF) in 1996 to form BNSF.

 the rail line gets about seven trains daily, most of which are coal and one local that works Sunday and Wednesday Speed limits along some parts of the line are a maximum of 49 mph.

Rail yard
The Brainerd Sub features one small rail yard in Brainerd. Most of the yard is maintenance-of-way equipment based out of the BNSF Brainerd Shops. It also has a spur line that leads to Brainerd Industrial Center via a street running segment.

References 

Transportation in Minnesota
Rail infrastructure in Minnesota
BNSF Railway lines